Eston is a town in England.

Eston may also refer to:

Eston (name)
Eston, Saskatchewan, Canada
Eston, a trade name for Quinestrol
Eston (guitars). a house brand of Rose Music Australia